In Greek mythology, Cassiopeia (Κασσιόπεια), also Cassiepeia (Κασσιέπεια), was the daughter of Arabus (Arabius) and by King Phoenix of Phoenicia, the mother of Phineus and Carme, although the latter is more often said to be a daughter of Eubuleus, a Cretan. Other sources claim that she was the mother of the hero Atymnius by her own husband or by the god Zeus. Anchinos was also called the son of Cassiopeia and Zeus who seduced her by changing himself into the shape of her husband Phoenix.

Notes 

Queens in Greek mythology
Mortal women of Zeus

References 

 Antoninus Liberalis, The Metamorphoses of Antoninus Liberalis translated by Francis Celoria (Routledge 1992). Online version at the Topos Text Project.
 Apollodorus, The Library with an English Translation by Sir James George Frazer, F.B.A., F.R.S. in 2 Volumes, Cambridge, MA, Harvard University Press; London, William Heinemann Ltd. 1921. ISBN 0-674-99135-4. Online version at the Perseus Digital Library. Greek text available from the same website.
 Gantz, Timothy, Early Greek Myth: A Guide to Literary and Artistic Sources, Johns Hopkins University Press, 1996, Two volumes:  (Vol. 1),  (Vol. 2).
 Hesiod, Catalogue of Women from Homeric Hymns, Epic Cycle, Homerica translated by Evelyn-White, H G. Loeb Classical Library Volume 57. London: William Heinemann, 1914. Online version at theio.com
 Pseudo-Clement, Recognitions from Ante-Nicene Library Volume 8, translated by Smith, Rev. Thomas. T. & T. Clark, Edinburgh. 1867. Online version at theio.com